Eulimella angeli is a species of sea snail, a marine gastropod mollusk in the family Pyramidellidae, the pyrams and their allies.

Description
The helicocone shell grows to a length of 7 mm. Contrary to most other Eulimella species, the inside of the outer lip of a minority of Eulimella angeli specimens  shows some teeth in the aperture. The carina at the base of the body whorl is prominent. The opisthocline growth lines of the shell, in the shape of an inverted S, clan clearly be seen.

Distribution
This species occurs in the Atlantic Ocean off Mauritania and Senegal at depths between 18 m and 200 m

References

External links
 To World Register of Marine Species

angeli
Molluscs of the Atlantic Ocean
Invertebrates of West Africa
Gastropods described in 1997